Tioga Center is a hamlet in Tioga County, New York, United States. Tioga Center has a post office with ZIP code 13845, which opened on February 2, 1835.

Tioga Central School District operates public schools including Tioga Central High School.

References

Hamlets in Tioga County, New York
Hamlets in New York (state)